The Kugaryuak River is located in the Canadian Arctic territory of Nunavut in the southwest Kitikmeot Region. It forks into two entities, the Western Kugaryuak and the Eastern Kugaryuak and flows into Coronation Gulf.

Arctic charr abound in the Kugaryuak.

History
In 1928, a Hudson's Bay Company trading post was moved to Kugaryuak (Post Number: B.429) from Tree River.

The Kugaryuagmiut were a Copper Inuit subgroup that lived along the shores of the Kugaryuak. In 1990, three archaeological sites of tent rings were found along the Kugaryuak from precontact Inuit period.

See also
List of rivers of Nunavut

References

External links
 Photo, strandplain near the mouth of the river
 Photo, raised marine delta along the river
 Photo, bedrock gorge and marine beach plain, near the river
 Photo, delta at the river

Rivers of Kitikmeot Region
Hudson's Bay Company trading posts in Nunavut